is a town located in Okhotsk Subprefecture, Hokkaido, Japan.

As of September 2016, the town has an estimated population of 4,596 and a population density of 7.2 persons per km². The total area is 637.03 km².

Climate
Omu has a humid continental climate (Köppen climate classification Dfb) with warm summers and cold winters. Precipitation is significant throughout the year, but is heaviest from August to October.

Mascot

She is a salmon who 3 years old but acts like a mature person. She wears a large bag containing items such as nutrients that enables her to do any talents. Her favorite thing to do is being on the onsen while watching the clouds and the sea. She likes people who smile at each other. Her favourite foods are beef and seafood. She can survive in both extremely cold and extremely hot conditions. She wears a hat that looks like a parrot. She is unveiled in March 2019.

References

External links

Official Website 

Towns in Hokkaido